The Pakistan cricket team toured England in the 2001 season to play a two-match Test series against England in late May. The tour included three First-class matches, one University match and one List A match.

The Test series was drawn 1-1. The test series was followed by the Tri-nation NatWest series including Australia as well.

Tour matches

University match: British Universities vs Pakistanis

First-class: Derbyshire vs Pakistanis

First-class: Kent vs Pakistanis

List A: Leicestershire vs Pakistanis

First-class: Leicestershire vs Pakistanis

Test series

1st Test

2nd Test

External sources
 CricketArchive

References
 Playfair Cricket Annual 2002
 Wisden Cricketers Almanack 2002

2001 in English cricket
2001 in Pakistani cricket
May 2001 sports events in the United Kingdom
June 2001 sports events in the United Kingdom
2001
International cricket competitions in 2001